Henry Gyles Turner (12 December 1831 – 30 November 1920), commonly referred to as "Gyles Turner" was a notable Australian banker and historian.

Turner was born at Kensington, London. He was educated at the Poland-street academy and at 15 years of age was apprenticed to William Pickering, the publisher. In 1850, he joined the London joint stock bank and in September 1854, sailed for Australia, arrived in Melbourne on 4 December, and joined the staff of the Bank of Australasia. In 1865, he became accountant of this bank, and in 1870, general manager of the Commercial Bank of Australia, then a comparatively small institution. Under his management it became one of the leading banks of Australia. In the bank crisis of 1893, it suffered very heavy losses and did not recover its position for many years. There can be no doubt that there was much over-trading, and Turner was blamed for the bad state of affairs. He was, however, away in Europe on leave from February 1888 to March 1889, and it was during this period that the "boom" was at its height. He had hoped to retire at a comparatively early age, but now had to set himself to recover the lost fortunes of the bank. By 1901, the worst of its troubles were past and he was able to retire in his seventieth year.

Turner had always been interested in literature and during his banking life did a good deal of writing. In November 1875, he called a meeting of his friends at his house and, with the slender capital of £100, a literary magazine The Melbourne Review was started. It lasted just 10 years and was not only the longest lived but the best purely Australian review that appeared in the nineteenth century. Initially edited by Arthur Patchett Martin, Turner was joint editor with Alexander Sutherland during its later years, and supplied much of the driving force. In 1898 a volume on The Development of Australian Literature, written in conjunction with Sutherland, was published, and after his retirement Turner wrote and published in 1904 his History of the Colony of Victoria in two volumes. The First Decade of the Australian Commonwealth appeared in 1911, which was followed in 1913 by Our Own Little Rebellion, the Story of the Eureka Stockade.

In 1917, when in his eighty-sixth year Turner gave a public lecture on "The War and Literature" and succeeded in completely holding the attention of his audience. He died at his house, Bundalohn, in the Melbourne suburb of St Kilda. He married in September 1855, Helen Ramsay who died in 1914, without issue. His portrait by E. Phillips Fox, is in the national gallery at Melbourne. Apart from his historical writings Turner was a busy worker. He was at different times chairman of the associated banks, president of the chamber of commerce, president of the Shakespeare Society, president of the trustees of the public library, museums and national gallery of Victoria, and held numerous other offices in a large variety of institutions. The bulk of his estate was left to charitable institutions, his manuscripts and a large selection from his fine library went to the public library at Melbourne.

References

External links
 

1831 births
1920 deaths
Australian bankers
English emigrants to Australia
19th-century Australian historians